Run Baby Run (stylized as Run Babby Run) is a 2012 Indian Malayalam-language comedy thriller film directed by Joshiy, produced and distributed by Milan Jaleel through the company Galaxy Films. It was the first independent screenplay of Sachy following the split of Sachi-Sethu duo. The film stars Mohanlal and Amala Paul. The music was composed by Ratheesh Vegha, while cinematography was done by R. D. Rajasekhar.

The film, which is set in the backdrop of news media, has Mohanlal playing the role of a channel cameraman Venu and Amala Paul that of a senior editor Renuka. The story traces their relationship and professional conflicts. Run Baby Run released worldwide on 29 August 2012. The film was one of the highest-grossing Malayalam films of the year.

Plot
Venu is a high-profile news cameraman working in Reuters, who graduates from a premier film institute, but prefers to shoot news rather than the manipulated visuals for films. Venu is mostly based in Delhi, but has come to Kochi to appear for a case in which he is involved, and is assigned to cover a case involving a local politician where he gets to meet Renuka. Renuka is the executive editor of Bharath Vision and Venu and Renuka have a story to tell of their own. A flashback tells the story about how two lovers turned into foes.

Rishikesh is another channel head News Bureau of India, who is going through some difficult times, as some of his star performers have gone in search of greener pastures. Venu and Renuka come together to investigate a particular story about a murder planned by a major politician named Bharathan Pillai, who has lost his fame when Venu and Renuka had exposed a scam involving him. How Renuka and Venu again exposes Bharathan Pillai and reunite with each other forms the crux of the plot.

Cast

 Mohanlal as Venu
 Amala Paul as Renuka
 Biju Menon as Rishikesh
 Shammi Thilakan as DYSP Benny Tharakan
 Vijayaraghavan as SP Somarajan IPS
 Sai Kumar as Bharathan Pillai
 Siddique as Rajan Kartha
 Ameer Niyaz as Abu
 Aparna Nair as Indu Panicker
 Krishna Kumar as Vijayakumar
 Mithun Ramesh as Adv. Manilal
 V.K Baiju as CI Tony
 Joju George as Shibu
 Anil Murali as Sugunan
 Anoop Chandran as Vargeese
 Sivaji Guruvayoor as Minister Kunju Moidheen
 Jins Varghese as Sanju, sub-editor of Renuka
 Biju Pappan as Sukumaran Thampi
 Babu Jose
 Niyas Backer
 Nandhu Podhuval as Ravindran
 Ponnamma Babu
 Ammu Venugopal as Reporter
 Vandana Krishnan as Reporter
 Arun Babu as man in MLA office

Production

The film is produced by Milan Jaleel under the banner of Galaxy Films. Cinematography was done by R. D. Rajasekhar and music direction by Ratheesh Vegha.Art Direction was done by Sabu Pravadas, Publicity designs by Collins Leophil, Associate Director Shaji Padoor and Stills were done by Aaghosh.

Run Baby Run was written by Sachy.

Release
Mohanlal held a sneak preview of the film on 28 August, at a theatre owned by director Priyadarshan in Chennai. The preview was attended by Amala Paul, Priyadarsan, Suresh Balaji, Lizzy Priyadarsan, Ouseppachan, and R. D. Rajasekhar.

Reception

Critical response
Paresh C Palicha of Rediff.com wrote, "The acting department depends on Mohanlal a bit too much", but described Mohanlal's performance as "impeccable". IbnLive.in called it as a "gripping thriller" lauding Mohanlal's performance, script, direction and technicians said "the film is a roller coaster ride. The movie has the precise doses of actions, thrills, lighter moments and finer sequences which are also laced with a fine performance of the cast" and concluded "For the lovers of relatively well made thrillers, 'Run baby Run' is definitely your movie and you may love to see it, more than once. Forget the little glitches and watch the wonderful performance of Mohanlal.".

Oneindia.in praised Mohanlal's performance as "outstanding" and complimented RD Rajasekhar's cinematography. Sify.com rated it as "Very Good" and said that "Run Babby Run is a thriller that keeps you glued on to the screens. It is a gripping tale with some good visuals and excellent performances. On the whole it is an engaging thriller which has the right doses of histrionics, tautness, anguish and thrills."

G. Krishnamurthy of Indulekha.com said "Run baby Run is the only Malayalam film released which can be recommended to watch among the Onam releases.". Giving special mention to Mohanlal, Sachy, Joshiy, R.D Rajasekhar and other creative department. Unni R Nair of Kerala9.com rated 3/5 and stated "Joshiy is in full control. As usual, he has done full justice to the subject at hand and has delivered perfectly well." and with a praise for performance and technical aspects.

Raj Vikram of Metro Matinee gave a verdict "Run baby Run entertains" and concluded "In spite of all the faults, "Run Babby Run" manages to run and reach home mainly because of the overwhelming presence of Mohanlal who comes out with another mesmerizing performance. At times, the flick turns to a fine entertainer for this festival season even by leaving few down points.". Ashwin j Kumar of The Times of India rated 3/5 and said "The film depicts the true face of media war. The film is driven by a flimsy narrative and lavished with twists."

Box office
The film was screened in 105 screens in Kerala and outside the state. It collected  in 10 days and stood in number one position among the Ramadan and Onam releases at the Kerala box office even in the third weekend. And continued in 15 releasing centres in sixth week. IBN Live called it a "blockbuster".

Accolades

Soundtrack

The soundtrack was composed by Ratheesh Vegha, with lyrics penned by Rafeeq Ahmed. Mohanlal sings a folk number titled "Attumanal Payayil" in this film. The album consists of six songs. The album was launched on 25 August 2012 at Dream Hotel in Kochi. The event was attended by Mohanlal, Mammootty, Joshiy, Mukesh, Milan Jaleel, Ratheesh Vegha, Amala Paul and several personalities from the film industry along with the technical crew and cast of Run Baby Run.

References

External links
 
 

2012 films
Films about the mass media in India
Indian action comedy films
Indian comedy thriller films
2012 action comedy films
2010s Malayalam-language films
Films shot in Kochi
2012 comedy films
2010s comedy thriller films
Films directed by Joshiy